The Hans Berger Haus is a refuge hut belonging to the Kufstein section of the Austrian Friends of Nature, located in the Kaisergebirge mountains in Tyrol. The tenants run a well-known climbing school here.

Location 
The backdrop of these massive, rocky peaks is unmistakable. The Hans Berger Haus is a popular destination for hikers and an important base for mountaineers and climbers who set off from here for longer tours in the Wilder Kaiser. Only 15 minutes away is the Anton Karg Haus belonging to the Austrian Alpine Club.

History 
On 13 March 1911, the Kufstein branch of the Friends of Nature was founded. Their efforts to own a refuge hut belonging to the association were successful twenty years later when, on 30 July 1931, the municipality of Kufstein accepted the application for a building plot.<ref name="d56961">[http://www. meinbezirk.at/woergl/chronik/100-years-naturfreunde-d56961.html 100 Jahre Naturfreunde''']. In: meinbezirk.at, retrieved on 27 December 2013.</ref>

The refuge was officially opened on 17 July 1933 as the Kaiser Valley Hut (Kaisertalhütte); on 2 October 1933, a celebration was held to mark the "completed extension". At the same time, the decision to build a "big lodging house" had already been made.

In 1940, the Kaiser Valley Hut was sold by the Reich Association of German Youth Hostels to the German Alpine Club (Deutscher Alpenverein or DAV). Hermann Bühler began building a new DAV library here at the end of the Second World War after most of the previous one had fallen victim to the war.

After a major expansion in 1956, the Kaiser Valley Hut was renamed the Hans Berger House in honour of the long-standing branch chairman. Since 1968 it has been the seat of the Wilder Kaiser mountaineering school. The house was completely rebuilt and modernized again in 2009.

 Approaches 
The Hut Way (Hüttenweg), a 450-metre climb, begins in Kufstein-Sparchen and runs the length of the Kaisertal past Veitenhof, Pfandlhof, St. Anthony's Chapel (Antoniuskapelle) and the Anton Karg Haus without posing any difficulties, taking about 2½ hours to reach Hans Berger Haus.

Another option is the ascent from the Griesenau Alm'' in the Kaiserbach valley. But this requires ascending 600 metres to the Stripsenjochhaus, then a good 600 metres again down to the Hans Berger Haus; duration: 3 hours.

Crossings 
 Anton Karg Haus (829 m), duration: 15 minutes
 Kaindl Hut (1.318 m), via the Bettlersteig, medium difficulty, duration: 2½ hours
 Vorderkaiserfelden Hut (1.388 m), via the Hechleitalm, easy, duration: 2½ hours
 Stripsenjochhaus (1.577 m), easy, duration: 1½ hours
 Grutten Hut (1.620 m), via the Hohen Winkel und Kopftörl, difficult, duration: 5 hours
 Grutten Hut (1.620 m), via the Scharlinger Boden, Rote-Rinn wind gap, difficult, duration: 5 hours

Ascents 
 Ellmauer Halt (2.344 m), over the Kaiserschützensteig (climbing path), duration: 5 hours
 Ellmauer Halt (2.344 m), via the Rote-Rinn wind gap, duration: 4½ hours
 Kleine Halt (2.116 m), over the Kaiserschützensteig, duration: 3 hours
 Gamshalt (2.291 m), over the Kaiserschützensteig, duration: 4 hours
 Totenkirchl (2.190 m), climbing tour
 Stripsenkopf (1.807 m), easy, duration: 2 hours
 Pyramidenspitze (1.998 m), medium difficulty, duration: 3½ hours
 Sonneck (2.260 m), medium difficulty, duration: 4 hours

References

External links 

Mountain huts in Tyrol (state)